Zoltán Sándor (born 28 March 1926) is a Hungarian former sports shooter. He competed in the 300 metre rifle event at the 1964 Summer Olympics.

References

External links
 

1926 births
Living people
Hungarian male sport shooters
Olympic shooters of Hungary
Shooters at the 1964 Summer Olympics
Sportspeople from Pest County